EU Reporter is a Brussels-based news website publishing content relating to the European Union, founded in 2002.

In the 2000s a printed magazine edition was available for subscription, and distributed free to Members of the European Parliament (MEPs) and EU Council and Commission officials. In 2009 its target readership was stated to be elected representatives, large and small business leaders, and commentators about the EU.

In 2010 it was taken over by Colin Stevens. It had previously been owned by publisher Chris White who continued writing for EU Reporter as a guest contributor.

In 2021 its content was described by Politico.eu as a "blend of corporate press releases, original news and paid-for content". Some of the website's sponsored content is native advertising intended to look like a news article, without disclosing the sponsor. It is noted for paraphrasing Huawei press releases and publishing them as news articles. EU Reporter rejected the accusation of undercover lobbying, characterising the reporting as "an attack by Politico Europe on a smaller but successful rival publication".

References

Mass media in Brussels
Mass media in the European Union
Publications established in 2002